The Civil Service Union (CSU) was a trade union in the United Kingdom which existed between 1917 and 1988. It represented lower-paid staff within the British Civil Service such as cleaners and messengers.

History
The union was formed in 1917 as the Association of Government Messengers and Attendants and later became the Government Minor and Manipulative Grades Association. The union primarily represented staff who worked in the Civil Service, but also in other public organisations.

The CSU was seen as being more militant than other unions within the civil service and was, along with the Civil and Public Services Association, the first to adopt a strike policy backed by a fighting fund, in 1969. The CSU also supported introducing a closed shop policy within the civil service. By the late 1970s the CSU had 46,827 members, of whom 45,732 worked in the civil service. In January 1988 the union joined with the Society of Civil and Public Servants to form the National Union of Civil and Public Servants.

Leadership

General Secretaries
1933: Dick Gifford
1943: Victor Carvell
1963: John Vickers
1977: Les Moody
1982: John Sheldon

Deputy General Secretaries
1944: Robert Anderson
1953: Vacant
1954: Zed Smith
1960: Jon Vickers
1962: Les Moody
1978: John Sheldon
1982:

Presidents
1933: W. Ewart Llewellyn
1938: George McDouall
1945: Harold Newton
1967: Monty Rose
1984: Margaret Morrison

References

External links
Catalogue of the CSU archives, held at the Modern Records Centre, University of Warwick

Trade unions established in 1917
Trade unions disestablished in 1988
Defunct trade unions of the United Kingdom
Civil service trade unions
1917 establishments in the United Kingdom